These are the Billboard magazine R&B albums that reached number one in 1984.

Chart history

See also
1984 in music
R&B number-one hits of 1984 (USA)

1984